The Giant–Australian Institute of Sport Cycling Team was an Australian professional cycling team sponsored by the Australian Institute of Sport (AIS) and bicycle manufacturer  Giant.  Heiko Salzwedel and Brian Stephens were early directeur sportifs. The fusion of the Giant-AIS  and the Czech Husquarna  team in 1997 extended its International profile, allowing to include foreign riders, such as Jens Voigt, Jan Hruška, Tomáš Konečný. Consequently, the name of the team was changed to ZVVZ-Giant-AIS Cycling Team.

Sponsors

Australian Institute of Sport
The Australian Institute of Sport is the high-performance arm of the Government founded Australian Sports Commission.  In 1990, the AIS extended their commitment to Cycling and started the AIS  Road Cycling programme in Canberra under AIS Head Coach and Australian National Road Coach Heiko Salzwedel.  Initially, 12 cyclists have been offered scholarships, amongst them Patrick Jonker, Grant Rice, Darren Smith, Robert McLachlan, Robert Crowe, Jamie Kelly, Matt Bazzano and Jason Phillips.
In 1993, the AIS programme in Canberra was expanding to include the MTB and the Women's Endurance programme. Cadel Evans was in the first group of mountain bikers and Olympic Gold medalist Kathy Watt being the most prominent riders of the Women's Endurance programme. Damian Grundy (MTB) and Andrew Logan (Women's Endurance) have been appointed as AIS and National Coaches.

Giant
The Taiwanese bicycle manufacturer began its international sponsorship activities in 1991 with the Australian Institute of Sport Cycling Team.  Riders, such as Robbie McEwen, Patrick Jonker,  Henk Vogels, David McKenzie started their International cycling career at the Australian Institute of Sport on GIANT bikes.  When the Trade Team was founded in 1996, it became prime co-sponsor of the team bearing its name along with the Australian Institute of Sport.

Jayco
As a consequence of their long standing relationship with Cycling teams and races in Australia, the American/Australian manufacturer of caravans and motorhomes, based in Melbourne, provided the team with custom made motorhomes both in USA and in Australia.

ZVVZ
The financial support of Czech manufacturer of Airconditioning equipment enabled the Australian team to contract International riders, such as Jens Voigt, Jan Hruška, Tomáš Konečný and others.

Škoda
As a part of the Volkswagen Group, the Czech car manufacturer Škoda started their extensive and long time commitment towards cycling in 1997, providing the team with six of their then brand new model Škoda Octavia.

Team roster  1996

Team roster 1997

References

External links
 http://autobus.cyclingnews.com/results/archives/teams1.html
 https://web.archive.org/web/20110715150155/http://www.radsport-news.com/sport/teams_773_1996.php
 https://web.archive.org/web/20110223031833/http://fulltext.ausport.gov.au/fulltext/1997/ascmedia/#cyctop
 http://www.cyclingarchives.com/ploegfiche.php?id=9772

Defunct cycling teams based in Australia
Cycling teams based in Australia
Cycling teams established in 1996
Cycling teams disestablished in 1998